Lasioderma turkmenicum is a species of beetles in the genus Lasioderma of the family Ptinidae.

References

Ptinidae
Beetles described in 1999